Frank Griffiths was an Australian rugby league footballer who played in the 1930s and 1940s.  He played for Balmain in the NSWRL Competition.

Playing career
Griffiths made his first grade debut for Balmain against Western Suburbs in Round 15 1935 at the Sydney Sports Ground.

In 1936, Griffiths played at prop in the 1936 NSWRL grand final against Eastern Suburbs.  Griffiths scored a try in the match which was comprehensively won by Easts 32–12.

In 1937, Griffiths was selected to play for NSW City.  In 1939, Griffiths only managed 3 appearances for Balmain and missed out on playing in the club's grand final victory over South Sydney.

Griffiths played with Balmain up until the end of 1941 before retiring.

References

1911 births
Australian rugby league players
Balmain Tigers players
New South Wales City Origin rugby league team players
Rugby league players from Sydney
Rugby league props
Year of death missing
Place of birth missing
Place of death missing